Martin Girvan (born 17 April 1960) is a British former athlete who specialised in the hammer throw. He represented both Great Britain and Northern Ireland in international competition.

Career
Girvan had a personal best throw of 77.54m, set in Wolverhampton 1984, breaking both the British and Commonwealth records. His British record stood for 31-years.

He competed at the 1984 Summer Olympics in Los Angeles and finished ninth in the final. His best attempt of 72.32m was registered with his second throw.

In addition to his Olympic appearance he also won silver medals at the 1982 and 1986 Commonwealth Games.

Claims on doping
Outspoken against drugs in sport, in the late 1980s he made allegations of drug taking and cover-up in athletics. Girvan claimed that earlier in the decade, in order to test suspicions he had, he asked British athletics official Andy Norman prior to testing at a meet in Crystal Palace that his results would be "embarrassing", which he says prompted Norman to organise for his urine sample to be switched with another.

In another allegation, Girvan stated that leading hammer thrower Yuriy Sedykh once advised him on what type of drugs to take, during a coaching seminar.

Both Norman and Sedykh denied the allegations.

References

External links
Martin Girvan at Sports Reference

1960 births
Living people
British male hammer throwers
Irish male hammer throwers
Athletes from Northern Ireland
Olympic athletes of Great Britain
Athletes (track and field) at the 1984 Summer Olympics
Commonwealth Games silver medallists for Northern Ireland
Commonwealth Games medallists in athletics
Athletes (track and field) at the 1978 Commonwealth Games
Athletes (track and field) at the 1982 Commonwealth Games
Athletes (track and field) at the 1986 Commonwealth Games
Sportspeople from Wolverhampton
Medallists at the 1982 Commonwealth Games
Medallists at the 1986 Commonwealth Games